Linda Koch is a German-French geneticist, and the chief editor of academic journal Nature Reviews Genetics.

She is a specialist in mouse genetics.

Education 
Koch has a PhD in genetics from the University of Cologne.

Career 
She undertook postdoctoral research investigating a knockout mouse model of the fat mass and obesity-associated protein.

In 2009, she joined Nature Reviews Endocrinology initially as an associate editor, then as a senior editor, before becoming the locum chief editor. She was appointed as chief editor of Nature Reviews Genetics in 2014.

Selected publications

Personal life 
She lives in Ramsgate, England.

References 

Academic journal editors
Living people
University of Cologne alumni
Women geneticists
Mouse genetics
Year of birth missing (living people)
People from Kent